Kevin Frederick Flaherty (born 17 September 1939) is a former English cricketer.  Flaherty was a right-handed batsman who bowled right-arm off break.  He was born at Birmingham, Warwickshire.

Flaherty made a single first-class appearance for Warwickshire against Cambridge University at Edgbaston in 1969.  He wasn't required to bat in the match.  With the ball, he took the wicket of Dudley Owen-Thomas in Cambridge University's first-innings, finishing with figures of 1/69 from 27 overs.  In their second-innings, he took the wickets of Roger Knight, Bob Short and Jamie McDowall to finish with figures of 3/38 from 9 overs.  Warwickshire won the match by the narrow margin of 17 runs.  This was his only major appearance for Warwickshire.

References

External links
Kevin Flaherty at ESPNcricinfo

1939 births
Living people
Cricketers from Birmingham, West Midlands
English cricketers
Warwickshire cricketers
English cricketers of the 21st century